The final of the women's 200 metre butterfly event at the 1984 Summer Olympics was held in the McDonald's Olympic Swim Stadium in Los Angeles, California, on August 4, 1984.

Records
Prior to this competition, the existing world and Olympic records were as follows.

The following records were established during the competition:

Results

Heats
Rule: The eight fastest swimmers advance to final A (Q), while the next eight to final B (q).

Swimoff

Finals

Final B

Final A

References

External links
 USA Swimming

B
1984 in women's swimming
Women's events at the 1984 Summer Olympics